Martina Hingis and Sania Mirza were the defending champions, but chose not to participate together this year. Hingis played alongside Coco Vandeweghe, but lost in the quarterfinals to Tímea Babos and Anastasia Pavlyuchenkova. Mirza teamed up with Barbora Strýcová, but lost in the final to Babos and Pavlyuchenkova, 4–6, 4–6.

Seeds

Draw

References 
 Draw

W